John (de) Welles, 1st Viscount Welles, KG (c. 1450 – 9 February 1498) was an English Lancastrian nobleman who was made a Knight of the Garter.

John was born about 1450 to Lionel de Welles, 6th Baron Welles and Margaret Beauchamp. He was a maternal half-brother of Margaret Beaufort, and thus an uncle of the half-blood of Henry VII.

John died and was buried in February 1498 in Westminster, England.

War of the Roses
John's father, Lionel de Welles, 6th Baron Welles, was slain at the Battle of Towton in 1461, and his elder half-brother, Richard Welles, 7th Baron Welles, inherited the Welles barony. Richard Welles and his son and heir, Robert Welles, 8th Baron Willoughby de Eresby, were both beheaded in March 1470 for involvement in an uprising against Edward IV in Lincolnshire. After the death of Robert Welles, the Welles barony was inherited, in her own right, by his only sister, Joan Welles. However shortly after Joan Welles' death in about 1474/5, both her father, Richard Welles, and her brother, Robert Welles, were attainted by Act of Parliament, five years after their executions. As a result of the attainders, John Welles was not able to enjoy the title to the Welles barony until the attainders were reversed by Parliament under Henry VII.

A pardon in 1478 did not prevent Welles from participating in Buckingham's rebellion. He escaped to his nephew, the future Henry VII, in Brittany after its collapse. Henry knighted him on 7 August 1485 and he was created Viscount sometime between 15 July and 25 November 1486 and given substantial grants.

Marriage
Some time in December 1487 John married Princess Cecily of York, the daughter of Edward IV and Elizabeth Woodville, making him a member of the Royal Family. Princess Cecily of York was born on 20 March 1469 in Westminster, England and died on 24 August 1507 either on the Isle of Wight or at Hatfield.  The apparent aim of Henry VII was to reward his uncle for loyalty and keep Cecily from marrying a more ambitious man. John and Cecily had two children, Elizabeth Welles (c. 1489–1498) and Anne Welles (c. 1491 – c. 1499).

He died 9 February 1498 in London. Anne died soon after. His will is as follows:

See also
Lionel de Welles, 6th Baron Welles
John de Welles, 5th Baron Welles
Governor Thomas Welles
Baron Welles

References
thePeerage.com entry
 Chrimes,S.B., Henry VII, p. 36

1450s births
1499 deaths
Knights of the Garter
Viscounts in the Peerage of England
15th-century English people
People of the Tudor period
Younger sons of barons
Burials at Westminster Abbey